The Angola Horror train wreck occurred on December 18, 1867, just after 3 p.m. when the last coach of the Buffalo-bound New York Express of the Lake Shore Railway derailed at a bridge in Angola, New York, United States, slid down into a gorge and caught fire, killing approximately 49 people. At the time, it was one of the deadliest train wrecks in American history.

Train
On the morning of December 18, 1867, the New York Express left Cleveland's Union Terminal at 6:40 a.m. and was due to arrive in Buffalo, New York, at 1:30 p.m. John D. Rockefeller planned to make the journey, but arrived a few minutes late. His baggage made it onto the train; he did not. That day the train consisted of four baggage cars, one second class car and three first-class cars. Each wooden passenger car had a pot-bellied stove at each end to provide heat, and kerosene lamps for light. The train lost time on the journey. By the time it passed Angola, it was running two hours and forty-five minutes late, traveling rapidly to try to make up lost time. Its last passenger stop before the accident was at Dunkirk; it also stopped at Silver Creek, but only to take on wood and water.

Accident
This allowed  lateral movement on the Ohio gauge and created instability. As the train neared the truss bridge over Big Sister Creek just east of Angola at 3:11, it ran over a frog (the crossing point of two rails). The front axle of the rear car was slightly bent, and the frog caused a wheel on the defective axle to jump off the track, derailing the rear car, which then swayed violently from side to side. The brakes were applied, but the train still traveled at considerable speed as it crossed the bridge. The last car uncoupled from the train and plunged down into the icy gorge. The second-to-last car also derailed, but made it to the other side of the gorge before sliding  down the embankment. Only one person was killed in this car.

Deaths
The last car plunged  down the ice-covered slope to the gully bottom and came to a rest, at a 45-degree angle, with a fearful crash. The passengers were thrown together at the end of the car onto the overturned stove. The stove from the other end of the car fell upon them and released hot coals. The carriage immediately caught fire, the fuel from the kerosene lamps fueling the flames. Only two people escaped alive from the carriage; some may have suffocated, but the majority were burned alive. Witnesses spoke of hearing the screams of those trapped inside lasting for five minutes.

Reporting
The accident, dubbed the "Angola Horror", gripped the imagination of the nation. Accounts of the tragedy, accompanied by grisly illustrations, filled the pages of newspapers for weeks and showed the tragedy of those trying to identify their loved ones among the charred remains that were pulled from the wreckage. Frank Leslie's Illustrated Newspaper carried five sketches of the scene and concluded, "This railroad disaster is accompanied by more horrible circumstances than ever before known in this country, and its results are truly sickening to contemplate".

Aftermath
The accident and the public outcry that arose from it influenced many railroad reforms that soon followed, including the replacement of loosely secured stoves with safer forms of heating, more effective braking systems and the standardization of track gauges.

Memorial
In 2008, the villagers of Angola reserved a  parcel of land along Commercial Street and erected a sign to mark the site of the accident, dedicated to its victims. A second memorial to at least 17 unidentified victims buried in Forest Lawn Cemetery, Buffalo was planned and later erected in 2015.

See also

Lists of rail accidents

Notes

References

Further reading

External links
 Find a Grave memorial for 10 Angola Horror victiums
 Angola, NY Terrible Train Wreck, Dec 1867 GenDisasters.com

Railway accidents in 1867
Railway accidents and incidents in New York (state)
Derailments in the United States
Train and rapid transit fires
Erie County, New York
Bridge disasters in the United States
Bridge disasters caused by maintenance error
Accidents and incidents involving Lake Shore and Michigan Southern Railway
1867 fires in the United States
1867 in New York (state)
Chimney effect fires
December 1867 events